Canchón is a granite mountain in the Peruvian Andes, with an official altitude of 4137 m above sea level. It is located between the districts of Pampas Grande and Huanchay, the province of Huaraz, Ancash region, in the orographic sector called Cordillera Negra.

References 

Four-thousanders of the Andes
Mountains of Peru
Ancash Region